Igor Piddubny (also spelled Poddubny; ; born June 18, 1965) is a Ukrainian journalist, media manager, politician, and film director known for a number of documentaries that covered controversial topics in Ukrainian history and were aimed at Russophone audiences in both Ukraine and Russia. One of these documentaries, which delves into the life of Stepan Bandera, one of the leaders of Ukrainian nationalists, topped the ratings of UA:First, the national television channel in Ukraine, for the year 2015. Piddubny was also one of the founders of Robinzon TV, the first streaming television website in Ukraine. He received Merited Journalist of Ukraine award in 2015.

Media and political career

Early career: 1991–1999 
Piddubny was born in Kharkiv on June 18, 1965. He graduated from Kharkiv National University of Radioelectronics in 1991, and later took courses in journalism from the University of Vienna.

Piddubny's career in journalism started amid the economic chaos, hyperinflation, and uncertainty that followed the dissolution of the Soviet Union in 1991. In 1992, he worked for the newly formed Kharkiv newspaper ATV and became the deputy head of the Kharkiv office of Nika TV, a newly formed cable television company headquartered in Moscow. As both media projects failed and were restructured, Piddubny moved to the FM radio business. In March 1995, he became CEO of Radio 50, a local radio station, but after a period of media asset consolidation, the station changed its ownership, and in 1997, Piddubny had to leave. He briefly attempted his own advertising business, but returned to radio in 1998.

Politics and media: 2000–2010  
From the early 2000s, Piddubny partnered with Arsen Avakov, a Ukrainian businessman and politician, identified with the "Orange" political block. The block was then at the core of the opposition Ukrainian politics, mainly formed by Viktor Yushchenko's "Our Ukraine" and Yulia Tymoshenko's All-Ukrainian Union "Fatherland". Piddubny simultaneously headed several media projects sponsored and controlled by Avakov, including , radio station Novaya Volna, TV and radio company Radio-Artel, etc. Piddubny's longest involvement was with the currently defunct Kharkiv weekly newspaper, Pyatnica, where he served as an editor-in-chief from 2003  to 2011 (in paper format) and then until 2015 when it continued (as an online publication).

After the success of the Orange Revolution in 2005, Avakov was appointed the Governor of Kharkiv Oblast by newly elected president Viktor Yushchenko. However, due to regional political differences, the Orange political block was in the minority in Kharkiv Oblast. Considerable tension grew between centrally-appointed Avakov the two leaders of local government Hennadiy Kernes and Mykhailo Dobkin. Amidst this tension, Avakov-controlled media and Kernes-controlled media continuously attacked their respective opponents. In early 2007, Piddubny's new Opel Signum vehicle parked next to his home was burned in a night-time arson attack. Both Piddubny and Avakov denounced the attack and alluded that only two people could have behind it; however, seven years after the arson, the perpetrators had still not been found.

Meanwhile, in late 2005, Piddubny began his own political career in Kharkiv local government, joining All-Ukrainian Union "Fatherland" in December. In 2006 he was elected to the Kharkiv Oblast Council; later he became the caucus leader for the "Fatherland" minority in the council. In 2009, one of Piddubny's projects in the council was the electronic condolence book of Kharkiv Oblast which aimed to preserve information about local victims of World War II.

In the summer of 2010, Piddubny helped defending Kharkiv's urban forest from the road laying and the associated tree-cutting initiated by Hennadiy Kernes. The attempt to defend the forest failed, however, as the protesters were beaten and their camp destroyed by pro-Kernes titushky, and the road was eventually built. In 2010, Piddubny also served as an assistant to People's Deputy of Ukraine 

In the fall of 2010, Ukraine experienced a political shift when Viktor Yanukovych was elected president, reversing the Orange Revolution. As freedom of the press in Ukraine deteriorated, by 2011, most Avakov-controlled media were forced off the air or out of circulation.

Media and politics: 2011–present 
After the demise of most of Avakov's media, Piddubny remained the editor-in-chief of (online only) Pyatnycya at least until 2015.

By 2012, Piddubny's main project has become Robinzon.TV, the first Ukrainian streaming television website. It utilized YouTube as its underlying platform, and offered a mix of studio programs and live news, often from unpaid stringers armed only with mobile phones. In an interview, Piddubny said that the idea came from a Russian TV channel, Dozhd. He said that rather than create Robinzon.TV as a "political mouthpiece," his aim was something akin to a public broadcasting service. After the Ukrainian revolution of 2014, Robizon.TV was purchased by businessman and politician Yevheniy Murayev.

In 2015, Piddubny was re-elected to the Kharkiv City Council; his current term ends in 2020. However, he no longer represents the All-Ukrainian Union "Fatherland", and is listed as an independent member of the Council.

In 2015, Piddubny received the Merited Journalist of Ukraine award from the Ukrainian president Petro Poroshenko. As of 2016, Piddubny considered film-making his primary work.

Film making 
Piddubny's career as a film director began in 2010 with an hour-long documentary, Undesirables, inspired by his work on the electronic condolence book of Kharkiv Oblast. Undesirables spotlights how many contemporary Ukrainians have ancestors who were persecuted by communists or Nazis, resulting in significant omissions in ancestry knowledge. The film was positively received.

Although Piddubny's documentaries deal with Ukrainian history, they are filmed in Russian and specifically aimed at Russophone audiences in both Ukraine and Russia. Piddubny gave two reasons for this decision. First, Ukrainian-speaking audiences know Ukrainian history much better and do not have as many questions (or hold as controversial opinions) as the Russian-speaking Ukrainians. Second, because the Russian audience is considerably larger, Piddubny could make more money.

Stepan Bandera: Ukraine between red and black 

The documentary Stepan Bandera: Ukraine between red and black delves into the life of Stepan Bandera, a militant ideologist of Ukrainian nationalism. The documentary was filmed in 2014 in multiple locations, including Bandera's birthplace, Staryi Uhryniv; other Ukrainian towns associated with Bandera and his followers; Jezkazgan in Kazakhstan (the location of the largest Soviet labor camps for Ukrainian political prisoners); and inside Moscow archives. Like other Piddubny films, it was primarily aimed at the Russophone audiences of Eastern Ukraine and Russia.

The film received overall positive reviews from critics, who thought Piddubny managed to maintain an independent viewpoint free of propaganda for either side, and that such an account of Stepan Bandera was long overdue. Boris Bahteev, a  critic, believes, however, that Piddubny hadn't completely freed his worldview from the Soviet propaganda and mythology created around Bandera.

The documentary topped the ratings of UA:First, the national television channel in Ukraine, for the year 2015. It gained additional audience on YouTube and on 1+1 TV channel, and is being used in Ukraine in secondary schools as an educational aid. As of 2016, it remained the most-watched Piddubny film.

Crimea: Maximum Security Resort 

Premiering in October 2015, the documentary Crimea: Maximum Security Resort is a four-part miniseries that explores 250 years of the Crimean history. It investigates the question who had a more righteous claim to the Crimean peninsula, which was annexed by Russia in 2014. The miniseries received positive reviews from Ukrainian critics.

The miniseries utilizes many previously unpublished NKVD archive documents, prompting Inna Dolzhenkova, a Ukrainian Association of Cinematographers critic, to call the documentary "a painful slap in the face" to Ukrainians who became interested in the history of Crimea only after its annexation.

Ivan Mazepa: I appoint you a traitor 

Filmed for 18 months between 2017 and 2019, the documentary Ivan Mazepa: I appoint you a traitor explores the life of Ivan Mazepa, a controversial Hetman of Zaporizhian Host who is asymmetrically portrayed in Russian and Ukrainian histories. Piddubny's film crew worked in Ukraine, Austria, Romania, Russia, and Sweden to present a comprehensive image of Mazepa. Two Russian historians,  and  appeared in the film as consultants.

The documentary premiered in a Kharkiv theater in March 2019. Aside from Ukrainian television, the film was shown internationally within the Ukrainian diaspora in United States and in Europe, including Vienna, Budapest, and Stockholm. In 2019, it received Gran Prix at the historical film festival Poza Chasom and was the subject of masterclasses at the Kharkiv State Academy of Culture.

Full filmography

See also 
 Merited Journalist of Ukraine
 Cinema of Ukraine
 Media of Ukraine
 Arsen Avakov

References

Literature cited

External links 
 The official channel of Piddubny's documentaries on Youtube

Ukrainian journalists
Film people from Kharkiv
Ukrainian film directors
All-Ukrainian Union "Fatherland" politicians
1965 births
Living people
Recipients of the Honorary Diploma of the Cabinet of Ministers of Ukraine